The Johnson City Sessions were a series of influential recording auditions conducted in Johnson City, Tennessee, in 1928 and 1929 by Frank Buckley Walker, head of the Columbia Records "hillbilly" recordings division.  Certain releases from the Johnson City Sessions—especially Clarence Ashley's "The Coo-coo Bird" and The Bentley Boys' "Down On Penny's Farm"—are considered by music scholars as important recordings of early country music that influenced a whole generation of revivalist folk musicians of the 1950s and 1960s, including Bob Dylan, Joan Baez, and Doc Watson.

Background
The auditions were part of a search for native Appalachian-Blue Ridge Mountains musical talent.  Walker was a pioneer, as was Ralph Peer of Victor Records, in the art of remote recording, which was deemed more effective than bringing musicians to New York City or larger northern cities to record. They thought the unsophisticated amateurs would perform more comfortably in their accustomed surroundings.

First Auditions
On Saturday October 13, 1928, Walker auditioned musicians, with recording sessions scheduled for the following week at makeshift studios at the Brading-Marshall Lumber Company in Johnson City.  Amateur musicians brought their fiddles, banjos, guitars and voices to Johnson City to display their talents for Walker.  Participants included the Shell Creek Quartet, the Grant Brothers, the Roane County Ramblers, Renus Rich and Charles Bradshaw, Clarence Greene, the Wise Brothers, Ira Yates, Uncle Nick Decker, the Proximity String Quartet, Hardin and Grindstaff, the Greensboro Boys Quartet, Richard Harold, Charlie Bowman and His Brothers, the Bowman Sisters, Bill and Belle Reed, the Reed Children, the Reed Family, the Hodges Brothers, the Hodges Quartet, Bailey Briscoe, Robert Hoke and Vernal Vest, McVay and Johnson, Earl Shirkey and Roy Harper (Roy Harvey), George Roark, the Ed Helton Singers, the Garland Brothers and Grindstaff, Dewey Golden and His Kentucky Buzzards, the Holiness Singers, Frank Shelton and the McCartt Brothers/Patterson.

Second Auditions
Returning to Johnson City in October 1929, Walker auditioned the following in the second group:  Blalock and Yates, Jack Jackson, George Wade and Grancom Braswell, the Roane County Ramblers, Wyatt and Brandon, Roy Harvey and Leonard Copeland, the Spindale Quartet, the Queen Trio, Earl Shirkey and Roy Harper (Roy Harvey), the Moatsville String Ticklers, the Weaver Brothers, Byrd Moore and His Hot Shots, the Bateman Sacred Quartet, Fred Richards, Clarence Ashley, the Bentley Boys, Charlie Bowman and His Brothers, Fran Trappe, Eph Woodie and the Henpecked Husbands, Ira and Eugene Yates, and Ellis Williams.

Recordings
Popular recordings, such as "Roll on Buddy" (now a bluegrass standard) and "Moonshiner and His Money" by Charlie Bowman and His Brothers, along with "Johnson City Blues" by Clarence Greene, were made from the Johnson City Sessions.  Clarence "Tom" Ashley's clawhammer banjo classic recording, "Coo Coo Bird", was a highlight of the 1929 Johnson City sessions.  According to the North Carolina musician Walter Davis, he and Clarence Greene learned the art of blues guitar from the legendary performer Blind Lemon Jefferson, who played on the streets in Johnson City during the early 1920s.

Other States
In addition to the Johnson City sessions, Frank Buckley Walker (Oct. 24, 1889 - Oct. 15, 1963) scheduled recording sessions in Atlanta (1925 – 1932), New Orleans (1925-1927), Memphis (1928), and Dallas (1927-1929) to search out musical talent throughout the southern United States.  Walker recounted to Mike Seeger once during an interview:

We would build up the recording sessions in advance – getting the word around that at a certain time of year we were going to be there, and these people would show up from 800 or 900 miles away.  How they got there I'll never know and how they got back I'll never know.  This was natural.  Life in the country, particularly in the early days, was a lonesome life.  Farmers would often talk to themselves or to a horse and stock… and the sound of that railroad train, that lonesome whistle has a powerful emotional impact.

See also
 Bristol sessions
 Mountain City Fiddlers Convention
 Music of East Tennessee
 Old-time music

References

General
 "The Bristol Sessions: Writings About the Big Bang of Country Music," by Charles K. Wolfe and Ted Olson, McFarland & Co., Inc., Publishers, 2005.
 "Can You Sing or Play Old-Time Music?: The Johnson City Sessions, 1928-1929," 4-CD set with a 124-page hardcover book produced and written by Ted Olson and Tony Russell, Bear Family Records, 2013.
 "Can You Sing or Play Old-Time Music?: The Johnson City Sessions," by Ted Olson, "The Old-Time Herald": vol. 13, no. 6, 2013: 11-17.  
 "Fiddlin' Charlie Bowman," by Bob L. Cox, University of Tennessee Press, 2007.
 "Remembering Johnson City," by Bob L. Cox, History Press, 2008.
 "Anthology of American Folk Music," edited by Josh Dunson and Ethel Raim, 1973.
 "Hillbilly Music: Source and Symbol," by Archie Green, "Journal of American Folklore": vol. 78, Jul-Sep 1965, 204-228.
 "Walter Davis: Fist and Skull Banjo," by Wayne Erbsen, "Bluegrass Unlimited": March 1981, 22-26.

External links
"Old Time Music Heritage", Johnson's Depot Website
Clarence Horton Greene, "Johnson City Blues", audio recording

1920s in American music
1928 in Tennessee
1929 in Tennessee
American country music
East Tennessee
Johnson City, Tennessee
Music of East Tennessee